Norman Gillespie "Happy" Wann (July 8, 1882 – July 23, 1957) was an American football player, track athlete, coach of multiple sports, and college athletics administrator. He served as the head football coach at Ottawa University in Ottawa, Kansas (1908–1909), Millikin College (1915–1917, 1919–1922), Earlham College (1923–1924), Ball Teachers College, Eastern Division, Indiana State Normal School—now Ball State University (1926–1927), and the College of the City of Detroit—now Wayne State University (1929–1931), compiling a career college football record of 74–40–10. Wann was also the head basketball coach at Ottawa (1908–1910), Millikin (1915–1918, 1919–1923), and Earlham (1923–1925), amassing a career college basketball record of 128–79. In addition, he was the head baseball coach at Ottawa (1909–1910), Millikin (1916–1918, 1920–1921), Ball Teachers College (1927), tallying a career college baseball mark of 43–39.

Wann attended Earlham College, where he played football as a lineman and ran track. He left campus in 1908 one credit short of his BBS degree, which he did not receive until 1922. Earlham served with the American Expeditionary Forces in Europe during World War I. In 1929, he earned a master's degree in physical education from the University of Wisconsin. After his retirement from coaching, he moved to Eagle Harbor Township, Michigan. He died there on July 23, 1957. Three years earlier, in 1954, he was inducted into Earlham's Athletic Hall of Fame. In 1986, he was inducted into the Wayne State University Athletics Hall of Fame.

Head coaching record

Football

References

External links
 

1882 births
1957 deaths
Ball State Cardinals baseball coaches
Ball State Cardinals football coaches
Earlham Quakers football coaches
Earlham Quakers football players
Earlham Quakers men's basketball coaches
Millikin Big Blue baseball coaches
Millikin Big Blue football coaches
Millikin Big Blue men's basketball coaches
Ottawa Braves baseball coaches
Ottawa Braves basketball coaches
Ottawa Braves football coaches
Wayne State Warriors football coaches
College tennis coaches in the United States
College men's track and field athletes in the United States
College track and field coaches in the United States
United States Army personnel of World War I
University of Wisconsin–Madison School of Education alumni
People from Fountain County, Indiana
People from Keweenaw County, Michigan
Coaches of American football from Indiana
Players of American football from Indiana
Baseball coaches from Indiana
Basketball coaches from Indiana
Tennis coaches from Indiana